The 2010 season for , its first, began in January with the Tour Down Under. As a UCI ProTour team, they were automatically invited and obliged to attend every event in the ProTour. The team formed for the 2010 season as part of an initiative by British Cycling to produce the first ever British Tour de France winner within five years. Much of the team's ridership is British, most of it is anglophone, and the team competes under a British licence. Its manager is Dave Brailsford, the former Performance Director of British Cycling. Senior Director Sportif was Australian ex-professional road cyclist Scott Sunderland. Team Sky's other Sports Directors were former professional cyclists Marcus Ljungqvist from Sweden, the Briton Sean Yates, and Steven de Jongh from the Netherlands.

2010 roster
Ages as of 1 January 2010.

Riders' 2009 teams

One-day races
Before the spring season began, the team took a victory in its first-ever race. Henderson was the team's captain for the Cancer Council Helpline Classic, a  criterium run two days before the Tour Down Under with the same peloton, but not counting toward its standings. Team Sky was largely responsible for bringing back a breakaway that included Lance Armstrong and Óscar Pereiro, with Downing and Sutton leading Henderson out to the sprint win. Sutton finished the race in second place just behind Henderson.

National championships
At the British National Road Race Championships Team Sky controlled the men's race ending with riders in the top three positions. Geraint Thomas won the race, Peter Kennaugh came second and Ian Stannard came third. In the British National Time Trial Championships again claimed the top three with Bradley Wiggins retaining his title. In Norway Edvald Boasson Hagen won his National Time Trial Championships for the fourth time.

Stage races

Henderson finished third overall in the Tour Down Under, after taking second place on stages 2 and 6 of the six-stage race. His teammate Sutton was the rider to beat him on the final stage. The team won the team time trial stage which opened the Tour of Qatar, giving Boasson Hagen the race lead.

Later in February, at the inaugural Tour of Oman, Boasson Hagen again took race leadership, with third in a sprint to finish the race's second stage. He extended his lead with a victory in stage 3, but lost it the next day in a controversial stage 4. After Team Sky, who were pacing the peloton as the team of the race leader, let a morning breakaway get over seven minutes on a flat course, emotions ran high when no team seemed willing to help them bring the group back. Sky riders responded by pulling the peloton quickly through the stage's feed zone, something which is normally not done. Later,  attacked  from the end of the stage, while Boasson Hagen had stopped to urinate at the side of the road, also something which is normally not done. Boasson Hagen lost a minute and five seconds on the stage, and the race leader's red jersey. Boasson Hagen went on to win the stage 6 time trial to close the event, winning the points and youth classifications in the race and finishing second overall.

Grand Tours

Giro d'Italia
The first Grand Tour for Team Sky started out nicely with Bradley Wiggins winning the first stage. This put him into the Maglia Rosa, he would only wear it for one stage. Chris Froome was disqualified during stage 19 for holding onto a police motorbike. The team had a few near misses with stage wins; Coming second in the team time trial by only 13 seconds to Liquigas–Doimo and Greg Henderson's second-place finish in Stage 13.

Tour de France
The team were awarded a wild-card entry for the 2010 Tour de France. In stage 2 of the tour Geraint Thomas finished second on the stage putting him into the lead of the youth classification, he would retain this jersey until stage 7 where he lost 3 minutes on the overall leader.

Vuelta a España
Team Sky received an invite to participate in the 2010 Vuelta a España.

During the race, many of the team's riders and staff contracted an unknown virus. John Lee Augustyn, Juan Antonio Flecha, and Ben Swift were forced to retire from the race due to illness. Soigneur Txema Gonzalez died five days after being admitted to hospital due to an unrelated bacterial infection, with the team withdrawing from the race before the start of stage eight.

Season victories

Footnotes

References

External links

2010 road cycling season by team
Ineos Grenadiers
2010 in British sport